Kemi Oba culture, ca. 3700—2200 BC, an archaeological culture at the northwest face of the Sea of Azov, the lower Bug and Dnieper Rivers and the Crimea. The Kemi Oba culture is contemporaneous and partly overlapping with the Catacomb culture.

Origins
According to Mallory, this was a component of the larger Yamnaya horizon, while Anthony regards it to be a separate culture, which was replaced by a late Yamnaya variant after 2800 BCE.

Characteristics
The economy was based on both stockbreeding and agriculture. It had its own distinctive pottery, which is suggested to be more refined than that of its neighbors. 

The inhumation practice was to lay the remains on its side, with the knees flexed, in pits, stone lined cists or timber-framed graves topped with a kurgan. Of particular interest are carved stone stelae or menhirs that also show up in secondary use in Yamnaya culture burials.

Metal objects were imported from the Maykop culture. Strong links have been suggested with the adjacent/overlapping Lower Mikhaylovka group.

References

Sources

External links

Archaeological cultures of Eastern Europe
Archaeological cultures in Ukraine
Bronze Age cultures of Europe
Indo-European archaeological cultures